Reed is a common name for several tall, grass-like plants of wetlands.

Varieties
They are all members of the order Poales (in the modern, expanded circumscription), and include:

In the grass family, Poaceae 
 Common reed (Phragmites australis), the original species named reed
 Giant reed (Arundo donax), used for making reeds for musical instruments
 Burma reed (Neyraudia reynaudiana)
 Reed canary-grass (Phalaris arundinacea)
 Reed sweet-grass (Glyceria maxima)
 Small-reed (Calamagrostis species)

In the sedge family, Cyperaceae
 Paper reed or papyrus (Cyperus papyrus), the source of the Ancient Egyptian writing material, also used for making boats

In the family Typhaceae
 Bur-reed (Sparganium species)
 Reed-mace (Typha species), also called bulrush or cattail

In the family Restionaceae
 Cape thatching reed (Elegia tectorum), a restio originating from the South-western Cape, South Africa.
 Thatching reed (Thamnochortus insignis), another restio species originating from the same geographic region.

Use in construction

Many different cultures have used reeds in construction of buildings of various types for at least thousands of years. One contemporary example is the Marsh Arabs.

Thatching

Phragmites australis, the common reed, is used in many areas for thatching roofs. In the United Kingdom, common reed used for this purpose is known as "Norfolk reed" or "water reed". However, "wheat reed" and "Devon reed" are not reeds but long-stemmed wheat straw.

Use in music
Ancient Greeks used Arundo donax to make flutes known as kalamaulos; this is a compound word, from kalamos (cane) + aulos (flute). At the time, the best cane for flutes came from the banks of river Kephissos, in Attica, Greece. Several kalamaulos tuned differently and tied together, made a syrinx or Panpipes. A. donax is still the principal source material of reed makers for clarinets, saxophones, oboes, bassoons, bagpipes, and other woodwind instruments. The Var country in southern France contains the best-known supply of instrument reeds.

Other uses
Bamboo and, even more commonly, rattan stems are used as "reed sticks" to wick and disperse the scent of essential oils in aroma diffusers. (See .)

See also

 Bamboo
 Constructed wetland
 Rattan
 Reed bed
 Reed boat
 Reed fields
 Reed level

References

External links 

Poales